Lucy Mackintosh is a New Zealand historian, curator and author who is a senior research fellow of  Tāmaki Paenga Hira/Auckland War Memorial Museum in Auckland, New Zealand. She is an honorary historian in the Faculty of Arts at the Waipapa Taumata Rau/University of Auckland and a researcher for the Ministry for Culture and Heritage working on the Dictionary of New Zealand Biography. Mackintosh is best known for her book, Shifting Grounds: Deep Histories of Tāmaki Makaurau Auckland, which won the prestigious Ernest Scott Prize in 2022 and the Ian Wards Prize of the Te Rua Mahara o te Kāwanatanga/Archives New Zealand.

Early life and education

Mackintosh graduated from the University of Otago in 1992 with a Bachelor of Arts and received her Master of Arts in history from the University of Auckland in 1994. Her MA thesis was in environmental history. After graduating Mackintosh worked as a researcher at Kingston University and began working on the Dictionary of New Zealand Biography.

Career 

In the 2000s Mackintosh worked for numerous groups, including the Ministry for the Environment and the heritage division of Te Kaunihera o Tāmaki Makaurau/Auckland Council. From 2005 to 2014, Mackintosh worked as a consultant historian for Heritage New Zealand Pouhere Taonga.

In the late-2000s, Mackintosh lived in New Haven, Connecticut for two years. She worked with Alexander Nemerov, who later became a doctoral advisor for her Ph.D. thesis.

Mackintosh undertook research for her Ph.D. from 2013 to 2018. In 2019, Mackintosh received her PhD from Auckland University for her thesis, Shifting Grounds: History, Memory and Materiality in Auckland Landscapes c.1350–2018. The thesis was turned into an acclaimed book, published in 2021 as Shifting Grounds: Deep Histories of Tāmaki Makaurau Auckland. The book won the Ernest Scott Prize in 2022. One of her thesis supervisors, Anne Salmond, won the same prize in 1991 and 1998.

In 2019, Mackintosh wrote an article for The Guardian on Auckland's Ihumāto when a land occupation protesting against a planned housing development, was served an eviction notice and police intervened, exposing New Zealanders to its little-known history.

In 2020, Mackintosh, and fellow curator Nina Finigan, preserved objects of significance to Aucklanders' reaction to the COVID-19 pandemic in New Zealand at Auckland Museum.

Personal life

Mackintosh's partner is Ben Lawrence. She has two children, Ruby and Joe.

Bibliography

Author

References

Living people
New Zealand historians
University of Auckland alumni
University of Otago alumni
Year of birth missing (living people)
People associated with the Auckland War Memorial Museum